Kosamphi Nakhon is a district (amphoe) in the northwestern part of Kamphaeng Phet province, central Thailand.

History
In Sukhothai Kingdom era, Mueang Kosamphi was a satellite city of the frontier city Mueang Chakangrao (Kamphaeng Phet), at same level as Mueang Nakhon Chum, Trai Trueng, Phan, and Phangkha. Archaeological evidence of the ancient city was found in Ban Khlong Mueang, Tambon Kosamphi.

The minor district was separated from Mueang Kamphaeng Phet district and created on 15 July 1996.

On 15 May 2007, all 81 minor districts were upgraded to full districts. On 24 August the upgrade became official.

Geography
Neighboring districts are (from the northeast clockwise) Phran Kratai, Mueang Kamphaeng Phet of Kamphaeng Phet Province and Wang Chao and Mueang Tak of Tak province.

Important water resources are the Ping and Wang Chao River.

Administration
The district is divided into three sub-districts (tambons), which are further subdivided into 43 villages (mubans). There are no municipal (thesaban) areas. There are three tambon administrative organizations (TAO).

References

External links
amphoe.com

Kosamphi Nakhon